Butler High School is a public high school in Vandalia, Ohio, a suburb of Dayton. The school is the only high school in the Vandalia-Butler City Schools district. The school mascot is the aviator.   
Butler has been rated as "Excellent" since 2005 by the Ohio Department of Education. The school met all 12 of the state indicators for the 2005–2006 school year. As of 2019–20, they are a part of the Miami Division of the Miami Valley League (MVL) athletic conference.

Athletics
The Butler Aviators are a member of the Miami Valley League.

OHSAA State Championships
 Boys Bowling - 2019

Notable alumni
Josh Betts - Former National Football League Quarterback 
Dan Carter -  Former Member of Connecticut House of Representatives and 2016 Candidate for U.S. Senate
Taylor Decker - Detroit Lions Offensive Tackle, and 2016 NFL Draft 1st round pick
John Goldsberry - retired professional basketball player 
Schellas Hyndman - Former Head Coach of Major League Soccer's FC Dallas 
James Swearingen - American composer and arranger.
Cory Vance - Former Major League Baseball Pitcher

References

External links
 Vandalia-Butler City Schools website

High schools in Montgomery County, Ohio
Public high schools in Ohio